Mark Meadows is a British actor.

On radio, Meadows has appeared in Lost Souls and The Worst Journey in the World, both first broadcast in 2008 and directed by Kate McAll for BBC Radio 4.

On television, Meadows appeared as 'Reverend Wallace' in an episode of the BBC soap opera EastEnders on 29 July 2010.

References

External links

Living people
British male radio actors
British male soap opera actors
Year of birth missing (living people)